Sathyan (born Cheruvilakathu Veetil Manuel Sathyanesan Nadar; 9 November 1912 – 15 June 1971) was an Indian actor known for his work in Malayalam cinema. Known for his own style and versatility in acting, Satyan was one of the pioneers of realistic acting in Indian film industry. He is respectfully called Sathyan Master. He was also a soldier in the British Indian Army and later a police officer with the Travancore State Police.

Sathyan served as an officer in the British Indian Army during World War II. After the war he joined the Travancore state police as an inspector in late 1940s. During this time he got interested in acting and acted in amateur stage plays. He made his debut film in 1952 film Athmasakhi and rose to stardom with the critically acclaimed film Neelakuyil in 1954. He dominated the Malayalam film industry over two decades ( 1952 – 1971) along with his contemporary Prem Nazir.

He is remembered for his performances in Anubhavangal Palichakal (1971), Karinizhal (1971),  Kadalpalam (1969), Yakshi (1968), Odayilninnu (1965), Udhyogastha (1967), Veettu Mrugam (1969), Vazhvemayam (1970), Oru Penninte Kadha (1971), Karakanakadal (1971), Pakalkinavu (1966), Ningalenne Communist Akki (1970), Kayamkulam Kochunni (1966), Sarasayya (1971), Rowdy (1966), Mooladhanam (1969),Chemmeen (1965), Ammayenna Sthree (1970), Kuttavali (1970), Crossbelt (1970), Adimakal (1969), Thacholi Othenan (1964), Aadyakiranangal (1964) and Mudiyanaya Puthran (1961).

Sathyan won the Best Actor Award at the inaugural Kerala State Film Award ceremony for his double role in Kadalpalam. He won the Kerala State Film Award for Best Actor again in 1971 for his film Karakanakadal.

Personal life

Sathyan was born in a Christian (C.S.I.) Nadar family at Aramada, Thrikkannapuram, Thiruvananthapuram on 9 November 1912 as the first child of Cheruvilakathu Veettil Manuel and Emily. He has four siblings named Chellayya, Neshan, Devadas, and Jacob.

Sathyan passed the Vidwan exam, equivalent to Master of Arts before joining St. Joseph's Higher Secondary School, Trivandrum as a teacher. After some time, he got job as a clerk in the Kerala Secretariat and worked there for about a year. He joined the army in 1941 and got posted as a Commissioned Officer of the Viceroy of India. He served the British army in Manipur, Burma (now Myanmar) and British Malaya (now Malaysia) during the World War II period. After finishing his term in the army, he returned home and joined the then Travancore State Police as a police inspector. During the Punnapra-Vayalar uprising in 1946, Sathyan was the inspector at Alappuzha North Police Station.

Sathyan was married to Jessy until his death in 1971. They have three sons: Prakash, Satheesh and Jeevan.

Entry to films

Sathyan's entry into the field of acting started during his tenure as the police officer. At that time he acted in several amateur plays and that experience made him more interested in acting. His entry to film industry was accidental.  He got introduced to a film musician Sebastian Kunjukunju Bhagavathar during his tenure as Inspector in Alappuzha North Police Station. The musician introduced Sathyan to various film personalities and one producer promised to cast him in a film; however, Sathyan did not get any calls from the producer. Sathyan came to know about a film that Kaumudi Chief Editor and his neighbour K. Balakrishnan were planning. He met Balakrishnan and the latter was impressed by Sathyan. Balakrishnan cast him as the protagonist in the film written and produced by him, titled Thyagaseema. The then Deputy Superintendent of Police, Mary Arputham, objected to Sathyan acting in the film. Sathyan resigned from his job to act in this film and shortened his name to Sathyan from Sathyaneshan. However, the film was dropped. Thyagaseema was also incidentally the first film for Prem Nazir.

In 1952 P. Subramaniam established Neela Productions. He happened to see the rushes of Thyagaseema and was impressed by Sathyan's performance. Subramaniam invited Sathyan to act as hero in his first film Athmasakhi (1952) which was Sathyan's first release.

Film career

Rise to stardom

In 1952, Sathyan's first film got released. The film was titled Athmasakhi and it earned him recognition in the industry. Sathyan rose to fame with the legendary Neelakkuyil (1954). The film was also a milestone in Malayalam film history. It was the first film to have an authentic Malayalam story. The film was written by renowned literary figure Uroob and directed by Ramu Karyat-P. Bhaskaran duo. The songs in the film written by P. Bhaskaran and set to tunes by K. Raghavan were superhits. The film became the first Malayalam film to win national recognition when it was awarded the Rajat Kamal (Silver Lotus Award). The film's success at the box office raised Sathyan and his co-star Miss Kumari to stardom.

Peak time

Sathyan's career was influenced by great directors like K. S. Sethumadhavan, P. Venu, A. Vincent and Ramu Karyat. Sathyan's roles in various films directed by K. S. Sethumadhavan like Pappu in Odayil Ninnu, Jayarajan in Daham, Prof. Sreeni in Yakshi (first psychological thriller in Malayalam) and the pratogonist in Vazhve Mayam were well appreciated. Sathyan's other major performances include those in Udhyogastha, Snehaseema, Nairu Pidicha Pulivalu, Veettu Mrugam, Mudiyanaya Puthran, Bharya, Shakuntala, Kayamkulam Kochunni, Adimakal and Karakanakadal. His famous title character 'Othenan' in the film Thacholi Othenan became highly popular among the masses. His role in Chemmeen, the poignant love story set against the background of the coast of Alappuzha did not win him the best actor award for the year, but is one of the most popular roles of his career. He acted in over 150 Malayalam films and two Tamil films.

Sathyan won the first Kerala State Film Award for Best Actor in 1969 for the double role in Kadalpalam.

Final films

Vazhve Mayam, Anubhavangal Paalichakal, Karakanakadal which won high critical acclaim were among his final films. Other releases were Bhikara Nimishankal, Aranazhikaneram and Oru Penninte Katha (as Madhavan Thambi). Sathyan died before completing the movie 'Anubhavangal Paalichakal.' It is said that the expressions of Sathyan in the song 'Pravaachankanmare' in that movie is real because of the pain he suffered in real life. It is also said that, the final scenes of Sathyan in the movie are made with a dupe and the crying scene of Sheela in the climax is real because of the departure of Sathyan in real life. He was posthumously awarded the Kerala State Film Award for Best Actor in 1971 for his performance in Karakanakadal. Mammootty and Suresh Gopi debuted in film as child artists in Sathyan's movies. Mammootty in Anubhavangal Paalichakal and Suresh Gopi in Odayil Ninnu.

Death

Sathyan died of leukemia after fighting it for a year and four months on 15 June 1971 at Madras. He was aged 58 at the time of his death. His body was taken back to his native place Thiruvananthapuram, and was buried with full state honours. Thousands attended his funeral. His wife outlived him for 16 years, dying in 1987. His eldest son Prakash Sathyan died on Vishu day in 2014.

Accolades and legacy

Sathyan was a prominent actor to be considered as a superstar in Malayalam film industry after Thikkurissy Sukumaran Nair. During the late 1950s and the whole of the 1960s, he and Prem Nazir formed a bipolar industry with a considerable number of films starring at least one of them. He won the inaugural Kerala State Film Award for best actor in 1969 & again posthumously in 1971. There is a Sathyan Memorial Art Gallery in Thiruvananthapuram.

Awards and recognition
Kerala State Film Awards:
1969: Best Actor – Kadalpalam (First State Award receiver)
1971: Best Actor – Karakanakkadal

Film Film Awards:
1969: Adimakal

Popular roles
Below are a few of the most popular & critically praised characters played by Sathyan:
Neelakuyil (1954) – Sreedharan Nair
Thacholi Othenan (1964) – Othenan
Odayil Ninnu (1965) – Pappu
Chemmeen (1965) – Palani
Yakshi (1968) – Sreeni
Kadalpalam (1969) – Double Role
Mooladhanam (1969) – multistarrer with Nazeer
Vazhve Mayam (1970) – Sudhi
Karinizhal (1970) – Colonel
Anubhavangal Paalichakal (1971) – Chellappan
Karakanakadal (1971) – posthumous state award winner

Memorials

Awards established in his name
 Sathyan National Film Award (Sathyan Foundation) : An award instituted by the "Sathyan Foundation"  a charitable organization formed with the basic objective of perpetuating the memory of veteran actor Sathyan by his children and grand child. The "Sathyan National Film Award" is presented annually to an eminent personality of Indian cinema. Memento, certificate and 25000rs/- are given as award for the awardees.
Winners: Murali, Thilakan, P. Bhaskaran, Balachandra Menon, Kalabhavan Mani, Sheela, Nedumudi Venu, Dileep, K. S. Chithra, K.J Yesudas, Kalabhavan Mani, Madhu, Sharada, Suresh Gopi,M. Jayachandran, Sreekumaran Thampi, Jerry Amaldev.

Sathyan Award: An award instituted by the Kerala Cultural Forum. The award carries a sum of Rs. 10000 and a plaque.
Winner: Innocent (2007)

Sathyan Memorial Film Award: An award instituted by the Sathyan Memorial Arts and Sports Club. The award is given in various fields including Best Actor, Best Actress, Best Anti-Hero, Best Comedian, Best Newcomer and Best Singers (male and female), taking the last year's performances into consideration.

Filmography

Malayalam

Thenaruvi (1973) – Posthumous film
Lakshyam (1972)
Akkarapacha (1972)
Agnimrugam (1971) -guest role
Kuttyedathi (1971) .... Appunni
Thettu (1971).... Johny
Sarasayya (1971).... Dr. Thomas
Anubhavangal Paalichakal(1971).... Chellappan
Panchavankaadu (1971)...Ananda Kurup
Moonnupookkal (1971)
Shiksha (1971).... Surendran
CID in Jungle (1971)
Karakaanaakkadal (1971)
Oru Penninte Kadha (1971)
Karinizhal (1971)
Vimochanasamaram (1971)
Kalithozhi (1971)
Kurukshethram (1970)
Sthree (1970)
Aranaazhikaneram (1970).... Mathukkutty
Nishaagandhi (1970)
Ammayenna Sthree (1970)
Dathuputhran (1970)...Kunjachan
Bheekara Nimishangal (1970)..... Mancheri Raghavan
Cross Belt (1970).... Rajasekharan Nair
Othenante Makan (1970)... Othenan Kurup
Ningalenne Communistaakki (1970)...Paramu Pilla
Thriveni (1970)
Kalpana (1970)
Kuttavaali (1970) .... Kedi Krishnan
Thaara (1970).... Balakrishna Pilla
Nilakkaatha Chalanangal (1970)
Vazhve Mayam (1970) .... Sudhindharan Nair
Vivaahitha (1970).... Ashok
Veettu Mrugam (1969)
Sandhya (1969)
Kadalppaalam (1969)...Narayana Kaimal, Raghu (double role)
Urangatha Sundari (1969) .... Vikraman Kartha
Adimakal (1969) .... Appukuttan
Velliyaazhcha (1969).... Ravi
Mooladhanam (1969).... Ravi
Chattambikkavala (1969)
Koottukudumbam (1969)
Kaattukurangu (1969)
Vilakkappetta Bandhangal (1969)
Kuruthikkalam (1969)
Aparaadhini (1968)
Manaswini (1968)
Agnipareeksha (1968) .... Dr.Mohan
Yakshi (1968)...Sreenivasan
Velutha Kathreena (1968) .... Chellappan
Thokkukal Kadha Parayunnu (1968)
Kaliyalla Kalyaanam (1968)
Pengal (1968)
Vazhi Pizhacha Santhathi (1968)
Midumidukki (1968)
Kaarthika (1968).... Kunju
Sahadharmini (1967)
Thalirukal (1967)
Khadeeja (1967)
Mainatharuvi Kolakkes (1967)
N. G. O. (1967)
Swapnabhoomi (1967)
Kaavaalam Chundan (1967)
Sheelaavathi (1967)
Anweshichu Kandethiyilla (1967)
Udhyogastha (1967)
Postman (1967)
Ollathumathi (1967)
Chekuthaante Kotta (1967)
Naadan Pennu (1967)
Ashwamedham (1967)..... Thomas
Kudumbam (1967)
Pavappettaval (1967) .... Gopi
Arakkillam (1967)
Rowdy (1966)
Anarkali (1966)..... Akbar
Thilothama (1966)
Tharavaattamma (1966).... Gopi
Station Master (1966)
Kallippennu (1966)
Kayamkulam Kochunni (1966)...Kochunni
Pakalkkinaavu (1966)
Jail (1966)
Koottukaar (1966)
Thommante Makkal (1965)
Chemmeen (1965) .... Palani
Shakunthala (1965)
Daaham (1965) .... Jayaraj
Kadathukaaran (1965)...Ramu
Inapraavukal (1965)
Shyaamala Chechi (1965)
Devatha (1965)
Odayil Ninnu (1965) .... Pappu
Chettathi (1965) .... Premachandran
Kaattuthulasi (1965)
Ammu (1965)
Aadyakiranangal (1964).... Kunjukutty
Aayisha (1964)
Omanakkuttan (1964)
Manavaatti (1964)
Anna (Old) (1964)
Thacholi Othenan (1964)...Thacholi Othenan
Kalanjukittiya Thankam (1964).... Sugathan
Pazhassiraaja (1964)
Check Post (1974)
Aashaachakram (1973)
Rebecca (1963)
Nithyakanyaka (1963)
Doctor (1963) .... Rajendran
Ammaye Kaanaan (1963) .... Chandran
Moodupadam (1963)
Kadalamma (1963)
Baalya Prathijna (Purusharathnam) (1972)
Akkarappacha (1972)
Kalippaava (1972)
Paalaattu Koman (Konkiyamma) (1962)
Bhaagyajaathakam (1962)
Laila Majnu (1962)
Vidhi Thanna Vilakku (1962)
Sreekovil (1962)
Puthiya Akasam Puthiya Bhoomi (1962) .... Sukumaran
Kannum Karalum (1962)
Viyarppinte Vila (1962)
Bhaarya (1962)
Krishnakuchela (1961)
Arappavan (1961).... Vettukaaran Ramu
Mudiyanaya Puthran (1961).... Rajasekharan Pilla 
Unniyarcha (1961)...Aromal Chekavar
Minnalppadayaali (1959)
Chathurangam (1959)
Nairu Pidicha Pulivaalu (1958)..... Chandran
Lilly (1958)
Minnunnathellaam Ponnalla (1957)
Achanum Makanum (1957)
Thaskaraveeran (1957)
Deva Sundari (1957)
Avar Unarunnu (1956)
Kaalam Maarunnu (1955)
Neelakkuyil (1954)..... Sreedharan Nair
Snehaseema (1954).... Johny
Aashadeepam (1953)
Lokaneethi (1953)
Thiramaala (1953)
Aathmasakhi (1952)
Thyaagaseema (1951) (unreleased film)

Tamil

Aalukkoru Veedu (1960)
Pesum Dheivam (1967)

References

External links
 

Male actors from Tamil Nadu
1912 births
1971 deaths
Kerala State Film Award winners
Male actors in Malayalam cinema
Indian male film actors
20th-century Indian male actors
People from Nagercoil
Deaths from leukemia
Deaths from cancer in India
Indian Christians